Tawau Division is one of the five administrative sub-divisions of Sabah, Malaysia. It occupies a total of 14,905 square kilometres or 20% of Sabah's territory. The main towns include the capital of Tawau, Lahad Datu, Kunak and Semporna. Tawau division has 26% of Sabah's total population, with the main indigenous groups consisting of the Bajau, Suluk, Ida'an, Tidong, Cocos, Murut, Lun Bawang/Lun Dayeh as well as a minority of mixed ethnic groups. Large numbers of both legal and illegal immigrants from Indonesia such as the Buginese and Torajans, from East Timor the Timorese, from the Philippines the Tausūg and Visayans as well South and West Asian immigrants such as Pakistanis, Indians and Arabs can be found in this area. As with the rest of Sabah, the division also has large numbers of ethnic Chinese.

Tawau port is the third largest port after Kota Kinabalu and Sandakan. The port serves as a major timber and agricultural products export centre. There are two domestic airports serving the Tawau division: one in Tawau and one in Lahad Datu. The division includes the islands of Sipadan and Ligitan, as well as the northern half of Sebatik Island (the southern half lies within Indonesia). It also includes Tawau Hills Park.

Districts 
Tawau Division is subdivided into the following administrative districts:
 Kalabakan District (3,885 km2) (Kalabakan Town)
 Kunak District (1,134 km2) (Kunak Town)
 Lahad Datu District (6,501 km2) (Lahad Datu Town)
 Semporna District (1,145 km2) (Semporna Town)
 Tawau District (2,240 km2) (Tawau City)

Kalabakan District was split from Tawau District on 1 January 2019.

Member of Parliament (Dewan Rakyat)

History 
The present divisions of Sabah is largely inherited from the division of the North Borneo Chartered Company. Following the acquisition of North Borneo under the royal charter issued in 1881, the administrative division introduced by Baron von Overbeck was continued by the establishment of two residences comprising West Coast Residency and East Coast Residency. Seat of the two residents was in Sandakan, where the governor was based. Each resident, in turn, was divided into several provinces managed by a district officer.

As North Borneo progresses, the number of residencies has increased to five including: Tawau Residency (also known as East Coast Residency), Sandakan Residency, West Coast Residency, Kudat Residency, and Interior Residency; the provinces were initially named after the members of the board: Alcock, Cunlife, Dewhurst, Keppel, Dent, Martin, Elphinstone, Myburgh and Mayne. The senior residents occupied Sandakan and the West Coast, while the other three resident with the second class residencies occupied Interior, East Coast and Kudat. The residents of Sandakan and West Coast were members of the Legislative Council, the Legislative Assembly of the Company.

The division into residencies was maintained when North Borneo became a Crown Colony after World War II. On 16 September 1963, with the formation of Malaysia, North Borneo which subsequently became the state of Sabah took over the administrative structure through the Ordinance on Administrative Units. At the same time, the Yang di-Pertua Negeri, the head of state of Sabah, was authorised by proclamation to divide the state into divisions and districts. The abolition of the residency term was in favour of the division term that took place in 1976.

Today, the division has only formal significance and no longer constitutes its own administrative level. The resident's post was also abolished, as Sabah's municipal administration is in the hands of the district officers.

See also 
 Divisions of Malaysia

Notes

Literature

References

Further reading 
 State of Sabah: Administrative Divisions Ordinance – Sabah Cap. 167 (PDF) of 1 November 1954; last amended on 16 September 1963, as amended in August 2010; Accessed on 3 November 2017